Cicada orni is a species of cicada belonging to the family Cicadidae, subfamily Cicadinae and the genus Cicada.

The genus name comes directly from the Latin cicada meaning "buzzer", while the species name orni possibly comes from Fraxinus ornus (Manna Ash or South European Flowering Ash), where this cicada often lay its eggs deep in branches.

Description 
The cryptic coloration of the body varies from brown to gray. The abdomen has reddish segments and a silky pubescence. The head shows large and prominent eyes far apart on the sides, three small eyes (ocelli) located on the top, very short antennae and a long proboscis used for feeding on sap. The membranous front wings are transparent, with well-drawn veins and several characteristic black spots.

Habit 

Adult cicadas can be encountered in summer feeding on sap from trees or shrubs, with their mouthparts well adapted for piercing and sucking.

Only males produce their well-known calling song, a clicking sound caused by the contraction and relaxation of abdominal membranes (tymbal). This song has the function of sexual attraction for females. Usually males sing in aggregations of many individuals on sunny tree branches. When the males are approached by the females, the courtship takes place, in which cicadas repeatedly hug and touch each other with their legs. At the end of this process they mate in the same place.

The adult cicadas lay their eggs in the summer, which hatch in late summer or autumn. While their lifespan as adults lasts only about a month and a half for breeding, the larvae live for several years underground, feeding on juices of plant roots.

Distribution 
This species is one of the most common in southern and central Europe, in the Near East and in North Africa.

Gallery

External links 
 Fauna Europaea
 Biolib
 David Element
 Sound recordings of Cicada orni at BioAcoustica

Cicadini
Hemiptera of Africa
Hemiptera of Europe
Insects of the Middle East
Insects described in 1758
Taxa named by Carl Linnaeus